Azizbek Turgunboev (born 1 October 1994) is an Uzbekistani footballer who plays as a midfielder for Sepahan and the Uzbekistan national team.

Career
Turgunboev was included in Uzbekistan's squad for the 2019 AFC Asian Cup in the United Arab Emirates.

Career statistics

International

References

External links
 
 
 
 Azizbek Turgunboev at WorldFootball.com

1994 births
Living people
People from Namangan Region
Uzbekistani footballers
Uzbekistan international footballers
Association football midfielders
Navbahor Namangan players
Pakhtakor Tashkent FK players
Uzbekistan Super League players
Footballers at the 2018 Asian Games
Asian Games competitors for Uzbekistan
2019 AFC Asian Cup players